A fruit is the ripened ovary of a flowering plant.

Fruit or Fruits may also refer to:

Places
Fruit Valley, New York

People
Fruit Chan, a Hong Kong screenwriter, filmmaker and producer

Arts, entertainment, and media

Music
Fruit (album), a 2009 album by The Asteroids Galaxy Tour
Fruit (band), an indie rock band from Australia
F.R.U.I.T.S., a Russian musical duo

Other uses in arts, entertainment, and media
Fruit (chess engine), a computer chess program
Fruit, a character on television series The Wire in the Stanfield Organization
Fruits (book), a book by Valerie Bloom
Fruits (magazine), a Japanese fashion magazine

Other uses
Fruit (slang) as well as fruitcake and variations (like fruit-fly) are usually derogatory slurs for gay and effeminate men (or LGBT people); concurrent definitions are more genial
FRUIT, a problem in secondary surveillance radars
Fruit of the Loom, an American apparel company

See also
Froot (disambiguation)
Fructus (disambiguation)
Fruitcake
Vegetable